New Communist Party of Georgia, is a communist party in Georgia. It is founded in 2001 by Yevgeny Dzhugashvili, the grandson of Joseph Stalin. 

The party symbol is a hedgehog. The party participated in the June 2004 elections in Adjara. The party is affiliated to the Communist Party of the Soviet Union of Oleg Shenin.

2001 establishments in Georgia (country)
Georgia
Stalinist parties
Communist parties in Georgia (country)
Political parties established in 2001
Political parties in Georgia (country)